Juan Esteban Ortiz (Medellín, August 29, 1987) is a Colombian professional footballer, who plays as a midfielder.

External links

1987 births
Living people
Colombian footballers
Footballers from Medellín
Independiente Medellín footballers
Millonarios F.C. players
Atlético Huila footballers
FC Dallas players
Águilas Doradas Rionegro players
Unión Deportivo Universitario players
Deportes Quindío footballers
Unión Magdalena footballers
Categoría Primera A players
Categoría Primera B players
Major League Soccer players
Colombian expatriate sportspeople in the United States
Colombian expatriate sportspeople in Panama
Expatriate soccer players in the United States
Expatriate footballers in Panama
Association football midfielders